Szybka Kolej Miejska (abbrev. SKM) is a generic Polish name for municipal rail transport network, and may refer to:

 Szybka Kolej Miejska (Warsaw)
 Szybka Kolej Miejska (Tricity)